Orlando Javier Elizeche (born 3 June 1987) is a Paraguayan Long Distance runner from Encarnación. He represented Paraguay at the 2008 South American Cross Country Championships, 2011 South American Cross Country Championships and 2014 South American Cross Country Championships and is tied to Club Bella Vista in the Federación Paraguaya de Atletismo. At the 2014 South American Cross Country Championships, he finished in 19th position of the Senior men's 12 km race event in a time of 40:48.02.

Competition record

International competitions

National championships

References

1987 births
Living people
Paraguayan male long-distance runners
People from Encarnación, Paraguay
21st-century Paraguayan people